Orga may refer to:

 Orga, Cyprus
 Irfan Orga (1908–1970), Turkish author
 Orga Sabnak, a character from Gundam SEED
 Orga Systems, a software company
 Kamen Rider Orga, a character from the Kamen Rider 555 film
 Orga, a monster from the 1999 movie Godzilla 2000
 ORGA (Organización Republicana Gallega Autónoma), a Spanish political party